Vugar Asadli (born 9 October 2001) is an Azerbaijani chess player who was awarded the title of chess grandmaster in 2019. Asadli is ranked as the 9th best chess player in Azerbaijan in the rating list of September 2020.

He scored 6/8 on the 3rd board at the 2016 World Youth Chess Olympiad, while in the 2020 Portugal open rapid, he scored 6.5/8, placing him in the 9th place. In the 2020 Portugal open, he scored 7/9, placing him in the 2- 9th place along with Hugo Ten Hertog, Evgeny Alekseev, Eduardo Iturrizaga, Aleksandar Indjic, Aryan Tari, Alexander Motylev, and Tigran Ghamarian. In the Baku Open 2019, he ranked 3rd with a score of 7.5/9.

Asadli received an international master title from FIDE in 2017, a FIDE master title in 2015, and a Candidate master title in 2014.

References

External links 
 

2001 births
Living people
Azerbaijani chess players
Chess grandmasters